The discography of UK-based pop-rock act Shakespears Sister consists of four studio albums, five compilation albums, one EP, and seventeen singles. Originally a solo act consisting of ex-Bananarama member Siobhan Fahey, it eventually evolved into a duo between Fahey and Marcella Detroit. They released their debut studio album Sacred Heart in 1989, which reached number 9 on the UK Albums Chart and was certified gold by the BPI. The album's lead single, double A Side "Break My Heart / Heroine" did not chart, the second single however, "You're History", reached number 7 on the UK Singles Chart, and managed similar top 20 success internationally. Their next three singles, "Run Silent", "Dirty Mind", and "Goodbye Cruel World" (the lead single from their second album Hormonally Yours), all failed to peak within the UK top 50. The second single from Hormonally Yours, "Stay" was the group's first and only number 1, staying at the top position for 8 weeks. The song also reached number 1 in Ireland and Sweden, and peaked within the top 5 in several other territories. Hormonally Yours peaked at number 3 in the UK and was certified double platinum, and reached similar success in international territories. The fifth and final single from the album, "My 16th Apology", was not a commercial success due to both members being on hiatus at the time.

Detroit left the group shortly afterwards in 1993, and Fahey resumed as the sole full member of the group. "I Can Drive" was released as the lead single from Shakespears Sister's third album, #3, and peaked at number 30 in the UK. Following this, London Records opted not to release the third album and the act was dropped from their roster. #3 was only released in September 2004 through Fahey's own website after London Records gave her the full rights to the album. Fahey was planning to release her own solo album at the time, which was preceded by three singles, "Bitter Pill", "Pulsatron", and "Bad Blood", which peaked at numbers 108, 95, and failed to chart respectively. In 2004–05, two compilation albums were released, The Best of Shakespears Sister (composed mostly of hits and B-sides), and Long Live the Queens (composed entirely of B-sides, rarities, and unreleased material). Fahey revived the Shakespears Sister name in 2009, and released Songs from the Red Room, composed of her solo recordings. A compilation album, Cosmic Dancer, was released in 2011, also composed of Fahey's solo work, acoustic work by the wider group, and covers.

Following Fahey and Detroit's reunion in 2019, the band released a compilation album containing two new tracks, titled Singles Party, in July 2019, followed by a 5-track EP of new material, titled Ride Again. A UK tour followed later that year.

Albums

Studio albums

Compilation albums

Extended plays

Singles

Promotional singles

Music videos

Other videos

Home videos

Notes 
 a These singles were released under Fahey's own name. Since their inclusion on Songs from the Red Room, they have been credited as Shakespears Sister songs.

References 

Discographies of British artists
Rock music group discographies
Pop music group discographies